Whitley County is a rural county in the U.S. state of Indiana. As of the 2020 United States census, the population was 34,191. Whitley County is the 49th largest county in Indiana. The county seat (and only incorporated city) is Columbia City. The county has the highest county number (92) on Indiana license plates, as it is alphabetically the last in the state's list of counties. It is part of the Fort Wayne Metropolitan Statistical Area and the Fort Wayne–Huntington–Auburn Combined Statistical Area.

History
Indiana was granted statehood near the end of 1816. On 7 February 1835, the state legislature approved an omnibus bill that authorized the creation of thirteen counties, including Whitley. It was named for Col. William Whitley, who was killed in the Battle of the Thames in the War of 1812.

The first non-Native American settlers arrived in the area during that year, as a result of the end of the Black Hawk War and completion of the Erie Canal. They were from New England - "Yankee" settlers, descendents of the English Puritans who settled New England in the colonial era. They were primarily members of the Congregational Church though due to the Second Great Awakening many of them had converted to Methodism and some had become Baptists before coming to Indiana. Whitley County government was organized in 1838.

In the late 1870s immigrants began arriving from Germany and Ireland.

Geography
Prior to white settlement, Whitley County's low rolling hills were densely forested, and dotted with lakes across its northern portion. At present, the available land is mostly deforested, and is entirely devoted to agriculture or to urban development. Its highest point (approx. 1000'/305 meters ASL) is a small rise NE of Cedar Lake. The Eel River flows southwestward through the lower part of the county, and the Blue River flows southwestward through the upper part.

Adjacent counties

 Noble County - north
 Allen County - east
 Huntington County - south
 Wabash County - southwest
 Kosciusko County - west

City and towns

 Columbia City (city/county seat)
 Churubusco
 Larwill
 South Whitley

Census-designated place
 Tri-Lakes

Unincorporated places

 Blue Lake
 Briggs
 Coesse
 Coesse Corners
 Collamer
 Collins
 Cresco
 Dunfee
 Etna
 Five Points
 Laud
 Lorane
 Luther
 Peabody
 Raber
 Saturn
 Tunker
 Washington Center

Townships

 Cleveland
 Columbia
 Etna-Troy
 Jefferson
 Richland
 Smith
 Thorncreek
 Union
 Washington

Lakes

 Blue Lake
 Brown Lake
 Cedar Lake
 Crooked Lake (part)
 Dollar Lake
 Goose Lake
 Indian Lake
 Little Cedar Lake
 Loon Lake (part)
 Mud Lake
 New Lake
 Old Lake
 Rine Lake
 Robinson Lake (part)
 Round Lake
 Scott Lake
 Shriner Lake
 Tadpole Lake
 Troy Cedar Lake
 Winters Lake

Protected areas
 Deniston Resource Area
 Goose Lake Wetland Conservation Area
 Pisgah Marsh Nongame Area (part)

Major highways

  U.S. Route 24
  U.S. Route 30
  U.S. Route 33
  Indiana State Road 5
  Indiana State Road 9
  Indiana State Road 14
  Indiana State Road 105
  Indiana State Road 109
  Indiana State Road 114
  Indiana State Road 205

Climate and weather

Government

The county government is a constitutional body, and is granted specific powers by the Constitution of Indiana, and by the Indiana Code.

County Council: The legislative branch of the county government; controls spending and revenue collection in the county. Representatives are elected to four-year terms from county districts. They set salaries, the annual budget, and special spending. The council has limited authority to impose local taxes, in the form of an income and property tax that is subject to state level approval, excise taxes, and service taxes.

Board of Commissioners: The executive body of the county; commissioners are elected to four-year staggered terms in county-wide elections. One commissioner serves as president. The commissioners execute the acts legislated by the council, collect revenue, and manage the county government.

Court: The county maintains a small claims court that handles civil cases. The judge on the court is elected to a term of four years and must be a member of the Indiana bar. The judge is assisted by a constable who is also elected to a four-year term. In some cases, court decisions can be appealed to the state level circuit court.

County Officials: The county has other officers elected to four-year terms, including sheriff, coroner, auditor, treasurer, recorder, surveyor, and circuit court clerk. Members elected to county government positions are required to declare party affiliations and to be residents of the county.

Whitely County is part of Indiana's 3rd congressional district and as of 2020 is represented by Republican James Edward Banks in the United States Congress.

Demographics

2010 Census
As of the 2010 United States Census, there were 33,292 people, 13,001 households, and 9,228 families in the county. The racial makeup of the county was 97.6% white, 0.3% Asian, 0.3% American Indian, 0.3% black or African American, 0.4% from other races, and 1.1% from two or more races. Those of Hispanic or Latino origin made up 1.5% of the population. In terms of ancestry, 38.2% were German, 12.6% were Irish, 12.5% were American, and 9.3% were English.

Of the 13,001 households, 32.5% had children under the age of 18 living with them, 57.4% were married couples living together, 9.2% had a female householder with no husband present, 29.0% were non-families, and 24.1% of all households were made up of individuals. The average household size was 2.53 and the average family size was 2.99. The median age was 40.1 years.

The median income for a household in the county was $47,697 and the median income for a family was $63,487. Males had a median income of $44,883 versus $30,724 for females. The per capita income for the county was $24,644. About 5.1% of families and 6.8% of the population were below the poverty line, including 7.2% of those under age 18 and 7.6% of those age 65 or over.

See also

 National Register of Historic Places listings in Whitley County, Indiana

References

External links

 Whitley County Government Website
 Whitley County Online Scanner
 Whitley County ARC Inc

 
Indiana counties
1838 establishments in Indiana
Populated places established in 1838
Fort Wayne, IN Metropolitan Statistical Area